Jonatan Brian David Fleita (born 20 January 1995) is an Argentine footballer who plays for Atlético de Rafaela.

References

1995 births
Living people
Argentine footballers
Association football defenders
Footballers from Santa Fe, Argentina
Unión de Santa Fe footballers
Nueva Chicago footballers
Club Atlético Temperley footballers
Atlético de Rafaela footballers
Argentine Primera División players
Primera Nacional players